Astrocaryum mexicanum, the chocho palm, cohune palm, or chapay, is a species of cocosoid palm in the family Arecaceae, native to Mexico and Central America. It is very long-lived for a palm, reaching 140 years. Local people harvest its young inflorescences, its seeds, and its hearts for food. Covered with stout spines, it is hardy to USDA zone 10a, and is occasionally planted as an ornamental in places such as Hawaii and Southern California.

References

mexicanum
Flora of Southwestern Mexico
Flora of Veracruz
Flora of Southeastern Mexico
Flora of Guatemala
Flora of Belize
Flora of El Salvador
Flora of Honduras
Flora of Nicaragua
Flora of Costa Rica
Plants described in 1853